Sheikha Aisha bint Khalfan bin Jameel al-Sayabiyah was appointed the President of Public Authority for Craft Industries, Oman in 2003.

Early life
Khalfan was born in Samail town, the youngest in a family with eleven children. She attended the Sultan Qaboos University, from where she graduated with a degree in arts in 1995.

Career
After finishing her education, Khalfan worked as a teacher. In March 2003, the Sultan of Oman Qaboos bin Said al Said issued a decree appointing Khalfan as the president of the Omani Public Authority for Craft Industries. This post is equivalent to the rank of minister without portfolio and hence she is regarded as the first woman minister of Oman. With this decree, Oman became the first country from the Gulf Cooperation Council to have a woman minister.

Khalfan is a member of the executive council of Arab Women Organisation (AWO) and headed the Omani delegation at the 2016 AWO Conference where Oman was chosen the president of AWO until 2019. She has also served on the University of Nizwa's Board of Trustees and is a cabinet member of Omani Women's Association.

References

Living people
21st-century Omani women politicians
21st-century Omani politicians
Omani educators
Sultan Qaboos University alumni
People from Ad Dakhiliyah Governorate
Date of birth missing (living people)
Year of birth missing (living people)
Women government ministers of Oman